Tir Newydd was a Welsh-language quarterly literary magazine containing cultural essays, book reviews, short stories, poems and political comment. It also includes publisher's advertisements.  It was published between 1935 and 1939 by Hugh Evans a’i Feibion, Gwasg y Brython, Liverpool; it was edited by Alun Llywelyn-Williams.

It has been digitised by the Welsh Journals Online project at the National Library of Wales.

External links
 Tir Newydd from Welsh Journals Online

Quarterly magazines published in the United Kingdom
Defunct literary magazines published in the United Kingdom
Magazines established in 1935
Magazines disestablished in 1939
Welsh-language magazines
Literary magazines published in Wales